This is a list of historical reserves in Azerbaijan, which includes 29 historical reserves in the Republic of Azerbaijan. 14 of these reserves are historical and cultural, 8 - historical and architectural, 2 - historical and artistic. Yanardag functions as a historical, cultural and natural reserve. 3 of them are located on the territory of the Nakhchivan Autonomous Republic. Icherisheher, Gobustan and Yuxari Bash nature reserves are a World Heritage Site, and Ateshgah, Ordubad and Shusha are on the list of candidates.

According to the Resolution of the Cabinet of Ministers of Azerbaijan "On approval of the Model Regulations on Memorial Reserves", the reserve is a state-protected territory and settlements where historical and cultural monuments, archaeological and architectural objects, ethnographic, numismatic, epigraphic, anthropological materials, buildings, memorials, objects related to historical events and personalities are located. Archaeological, ethnographic, architectural, urban planning and other complexes of special importance have been declared nature reserves by the order of the President of Azerbaijan.

See also 
 State reserves of Azerbaijan

References 

State reserves of Azerbaijan
History of Azerbaijan by topic
Architecture in Azerbaijan